Gary W. Parr is Senior Managing Director of Apollo Global Management and a member of the Executive Committee. He was a Vice Chairman and member of the Board of Directors of Lazard. He was an investment banker who had focused on the financial services industry for more than 30 years.

Career 
Parr began his career at First Boston Corp., where he worked on insurance industry mergers. In 1988, he was part of a group that formed the advisory firm Wasserstein Perella, co-founded by Bruce Wasserstein and Joseph Perella and rose to be Co-President. In 1993, he moved to Morgan Stanley, where his roles included heading the global financial institutions group and co-heading the global M&A division. He joined Lazard in 2003.

He has advised clients on many of the largest mergers and acquisitions and strategic investments in the financial services industry, including: the sale of Lehman’s North American investment banking business to Barclays; the sale of Bear Stearns to JP Morgan; Mitsubishi UFJ’s investment in Morgan Stanley; Kuwait’s investment in Citigroup; China Investment Corp.’s investment in Morgan Stanley; the merger of Bank of New York and Mellon; the sale of Donaldson Lufkin & Jenrette to Credit Suisse First Boston; Dean Witter Discover’s merger with Morgan Stanley; and Berkshire Hathaway’s acquisition of GEICO. He is also a founder of Parré, a luxury chocolate brand with his wife, Katherine.

Personal
Parr is from Charlotte, North Carolina. He attended the University of North Carolina at Chapel Hill. He graduated from Kenan-Flagler Business School in 1979 with honors, Phi Beta Kappa and Beta Gamma Sigma, and was in Pi Kappa Phi fraternity. He also received an MBA from Northwestern University’s Kellogg School of Management.

Bloomberg News, in an article titled "The Willy Wonka of Wall Street," has reported that he has founded Parré Chocolat, a luxury chocolate business with ethical trading practices and a transparent supply chain, with his wife, Katherine Parr.

Parr is said to enjoy architectural renovation projects, and owns historic properties in Tuxedo Park, NY and Palm Beach, Florida, as well as a home in New York City. He was formerly chairman of Venetian Heritage, a historical restoration organization.

He established the Parr Center for Ethics at the University of North Carolina at Chapel Hill in 2004. Among other activities, the Parr Center sponsors visiting scholars, talks by prominent philosophers, and intercollegiate debates on ethical issues. He serves as Chairman of the Center and Sarah Stroud became Director of the Center in 2018.

In October 2014, the Wainstein Report revealed that the Director of the Parr Center for Ethics, Jan Boxill, "... was responsible for funneling student-athletes into bogus paper classes and negotiating the grade they would need to stay eligible" in an academic fraud at UNC that persisted from 1997 until 2011. In November 2014, Geoffrey Sayre-McCord, an eminent meta-ethacist specializing in moral relativism and the ethical perspectives of David Hume, replaced Boxill as Director of the Parr Center  for Ethics.

In 2013, he was awarded the Distinguished Alumnus Award from the University of North Carolina.

Parr is currently chairman emeritus of the New York Philharmonic, and served as chairman from September 2009 to February 2015.

He also served on the board of the Kenan-Flagler Business School at the University of North Carolina at Chapel Hill.

Parr is known to be "a frugal sort who says he cuts his own hair".

He is married to Katherine Parr, an American-born, Villanova University School of Business-educated designer and entrepreneur; United States government-certified inner-city schoolteacher, and fashion model.

Affiliations
Chairman Emeritus and Board Member: New York Philharmonic 
Chairman: Parr Center for Ethics at University of North Carolina at Chapel Hill
Former Board Member: Lincoln Center for the Performing Arts
Former Board member: Berkeley Divinity School - Yale
Former Chairman: Venetian Heritage
Fraternity: Delta Sigma Pi
Fraternity: Pi Kappa Phi

See also
 Parré Chocolat

References

American investment bankers
Kellogg School of Management alumni
Living people
Northwestern University alumni
UNC Kenan–Flagler Business School alumni
Year of birth missing (living people)